Agylla prasena is a moth of the subfamily Arctiinae. It was described by Frederic Moore in 1859. It is found in India in the north-western Himalayas, Sikkim and Assam.

References

Moths described in 1859
prasena
Moths of Asia